District 32 of the Oregon House of Representatives is one of 60 House legislative districts in the state of Oregon. As of 2013, the boundary for the district includes all of Clatsop County and portions of Tillamook and Washington counties. The current representative for the district is Republican Suzanne Weber of Tillamook.

Election results
District boundaries have changed over time, therefore, representatives before 2013 may not represent the same constituency as today. General election results from 2000 to present are as follows:

{| class="wikitable" style="margin:0.5em auto; font-size:95%;"
! Year
! Candidate
! Party
! Percent
! Opponent
! Party
! Percent
! Opponent
! Party
! Percent
! Opponent
! Party
! Percent
! Opponent
! Party
! Percent
|-
| 2000
| | Janet Carlson
| | Republican
| | 50.47%
| | George Bell
| | Democratic
| | 49.53%
|
|
|
|
|
|
|
|
|
|-
| 2002
| | Elaine Hopson
| | Democratic
| | 51.26%
| | Joe Meyer
| | Republican
| | 48.48%
| | Write-ins
| |
| | 0.27%
|
|
|
|
|
|
|-
| 2004
| | Deborah Boone
| | Democratic
| | 50.16%
| | Douglas Olson
| | Republican
| | 46.88%
| | Ben Snodgrass
| | Constitution
| | 2.96%
|
|
|
|
|
|
|-
| 2006
| | Deborah Boone
| | Democratic
| | 61.86%
| | Norm Myers
| | Republican
| | 37.88%
| | Write-ins
| |
| | 0.25%
|
|
|
|
|
|
|-
| 2008
| | Deborah Boone
| | Democratic
| | 66.78%
| | Tim Bero
| | Republican
| | 32.89%
| | Write-ins
| |
| | 0.33%
|
|
|
|
|
|
|-
| 2010
| | Deborah Boone
| | Democratic
| | 52.22%
| | Lew Barnes
| | Republican
| | 47.60%
| | Write-ins
| |
| | 0.18%
|
|
|
|
|
|
|-
| 2012
| | Deborah Boone
| | Democratic
| | 68.35%
| | Jim Welsh
| | Constitution
| | 25.76%
| | Perry Roll
| | Libertarian
| | 5.45%
| | Write-ins
| |
| | 0.44%
|
|
|
|-
| 2014
| | Deborah Boone
| | Democratic
| | 60.22%
| | Rick Rose
| | Republican
| | 39.29%
| | Write-ins
| |
| | 0.48%
|
|
|
|
|
|
|-
| 2016
| | Deborah Boone
| | Democratic
| | 56.53%
| | Bruce Bobek
| | Republican
| | 43.17%
| | Write-ins
| |
| | 0.30%
|
|
|
|
|
|
|-
| 2018
| | Tiffiny Mitchell
| | Democratic
| | 49.03%
| | Vineeta Lower
| | Republican
| | 43.24%
| | Brian Halvorsen
| | Independent
| | 4.21%
| | Randell Carlson
| | Libertarian
| | 3.37%
| | Write-ins
| |
| | 0.15%
|-
| 2020
| | Suzanne Weber
| | Republican
| | 54.12%
| | Debbie Boothe-Schmidt
| | Republican
| | 45.68%
| | Write-ins
| |
| | 0.20%
|-
| 2022
| | Cyrus Javadi
| | Republican
| | 51.3%
| | Logan Laity
| | Democrat
| | 48.60%
| | Write-ins
| |
| | 0.20%
}

See also
 Oregon Legislative Assembly
 Oregon House of Representatives

References

External links
 Oregon House of Representatives Official site
 Oregon Secretary of State: Redistricting Reform Task Force

Oregon House of Representatives districts
Clatsop County, Oregon
Tillamook County, Oregon
Washington County, Oregon